Luka Lev Kiszka (1663—1728) was the "Metropolitan of Kiev, Galicia and all Ruthenia" of the Ukrainian Greek Catholic Church from 1714 to his death in 1728. He was also a writer, and theologian.

Life
Luka Lev Kiszka was born in Kovel, in Volhynia, from a noble family in the year 1663. Still young he joined the Order of Saint Basil the Great and he studied in Byten (Ivatsevichy Raion). On 6 December 1687, already ordained a priest, he entered in the Pontifical Urbaniana University, in Rome, where he studied till 1691. Returned in his country, he served as hieromonk in various Basilian monasteries. In 1697 he became Hegumen of the monastery of the Holy Trinity in Vilnius and in 1699 he was appointed Archimandrite of the monastery of Polotsk. In 1698 he was elected secretary of the Basilian Order, of which he became Proto-Archimandrite (i.e. Superior general of the whole Order) in September 1703 for his first four-years term.

Kiszka ruled the Basilian Order in a very difficult period, during the Great Northern War (1700-1721), and under the persecutions of Peter I of Russia against the Greek Catholic Church, as the murder of Basilian monks on 11 July 1705 by the Tsar's own hand at Polotsk. He settled a typography and worked at printing religious and liturgical books.

Kiszka was re-elected Proto-Archimandrite of the Order and in 1611 he was appointed bishop of the eparchy of Volodymyr-Brest. Accordingly, he was consecrated bishop 15 March 1711 by the hands of Metropolitan Yurij Vynnyckyj in Sambir.

At the death of Metropolitan Vynnyckyj in September 1713, Kiszka became administrator of the Church, and on 17 September 1714 he was formally confirmed Metropolitan of Kiev by Pope Clement XI.

Kiszka died in the village of Kupieczow, near Volodymyr, where he was buried, on 19 November 1728.

Synod of Zamość
Kiszka's more important result as Metropolitan of Kiev was the Synod of Zamość, opened on 26 August 1720, in which were codified the canons of the Ukrainian Greek Catholic Church. The synod issued nineteen chapters, concerning the faith (1), the predication (2), the sacraments (3), the diocesan organization (4 to 10), the monasteries (11, 12), the ecclesiastic estates (13, 14), the liturgical year and the saints (16, 17), and the promulgations of the canons (18, 19). The acts of the synod were approved by Rome on 5 December 1722.

Works
Kiszka was a prolific writer. Among his works we remember:
 About the Sacraments, in Ukrainian, 1697
 The see of grace, or of the miracles of the Virgin Mary, in Polish, 1714
 Sermons of Metropolitan Ipatii Potii, 1714
 Instruction for parish priests and catechism for people, 1722
 Manuscript with various historical notes, which includes an Ecclesiastic History of the South of Russia from the original documents, lives of notable Basilian monks, a political history of Europe.

Consecrations
 Hennadiy Bizantsiy (Greek Catholic Eparchy of Mukachevo)

Notelist

References 

1663 births
1728 deaths
Eastern Catholics from the Russian Empire
People from Kovel
People from Volhynian Voivodeship
Ruthenian nobility of the Polish–Lithuanian Commonwealth
Order of Saint Basil the Great
Metropolitans of Kiev, Galicia and all Ruthenia (Holy See)
Ukrainian writers
Bishops of Przemyśl